A number of karate techniques are used to deliver strikes to the human body.  These techniques are delivered from a number of stances. The karateka uses a number of blocks to protect themselves against these strikes.

Vital points

Arm techniques

Foot techniques

Foot movements

Stances

Blocking techniques 
pages 129-136 of Higaonna 'Fundamental Techniques'

See also
List of shotokan techniques
List of Shito-ryu techniques

References

Literature

External links
Karate in the Okinawa Prefecture